Charles-Pendrell Waddington (19 June 1819 – 18 March 1914) was a French philosopher, cousin of Richard and William H. Waddington. He was born in Milan, of a Protestant family of English origin. Graduating from the École normale supérieure at 19, he taught at various institutions, including the Protestant Seminary at Strasbourg, the Lycée Louis-le-Grand, and the Sorbonne, where in 1879 he was appointed professor of ancient philosophy.  In 1888 he became a member of the Académie des sciences morales et politiques. His works, notable for clearness and penetration, include:  
 Ramus (Pierre de la Ramée): Sa vie, ses écrits et ses opinions (1855)
 Essai de logique (1858)  
 De l'idée de Dieu dans l'athéisme contemporain (1859)  
 De l'âme humaine, études de psychologie (1863)  
 Dieu et la conscience (1870)  
 De la science du bien (1875)  
 L'athéisme en France à la fin du XVIIIème siècle (1892)  
 La philosophie ancienne et la critique historique (1904)

See also
 William Waddington, Prime Minister of France and cousin of Charles Waddington
 Senator Richard Waddington, cousin of Charles Waddington
 Alfred Waddington, uncle of Charles Waddington

French people of English descent
19th-century French historians
19th-century French philosophers
French science writers
Italian emigrants to France
Members of the Académie des sciences morales et politiques
Academic staff of the University of Paris
1819 births
1914 deaths
French male non-fiction writers